Under a War-Torn Sky is a young adult war novel about a young man flying a B-24 in World War II. When his plane is shot down and he is trapped behind enemy lines, he is helped by kind French citizens to escape and get back to his home. Written by American author L.M. Elliott, the novel was first published in 2001. It won a number of awards on publication and has sold over 200,000 copies in the U.S. and abroad.

Elliott drew inspiration for the novel from her father, who served in World War II.  He was a bomber pilot in real life and was shot down behind enemy lines, much like the main character in the novel.

The sequel to this novel, A Troubled Peace, came out in August, 2009.

General information on the author and specific information for students, teachers, and media center specialists can be found on the author's website.

Summary
At only 19 years old, Henry Forrester decides to join the war. He's one of the best fliers, facing Hitler's Luftwaffe in the war-torn skies above Northern France, but when his plane is shot down on a mission behind enemy lines, Henry finds himself on a whole new battlefield. Wounded, hungry, and afraid, he struggles toward freedom on foot, relying on the kindness and cunning of the French Resistance to reach the next town alive. Each day brings him nearer to home and closer to danger. Yet even as Henry struggles a lot for his own survival in a hostile country, he quickly grows to realize the great peril that surrounds all the French people, and to admire the strength and determination of the freedom fighters who risk death to protect him. At the end he gets to see his home and family.

Awards 
Notable Book in Social Studies for Young People (NCSS/CBC), 2002
Jefferson Cup Honor Book, 2002
Winner, Borders’ Original Voices Award for Young Adult Literature, 2001
Best Children's Books of the Year, 2002, Bank Street College of Education, CBC
Maryland Black-eyed Susan Award, finalist, 2004-5
Iowa Teen Award, finalist, 2003-4
Pennsylvania Young Readers’ Choice, finalist, 2002-3
South Carolina Jr. Book Award, finalist, 2003-4
Books About Trauma, Tragedy and Loss, 2002, CBC

External links
Website for author L. M. Elliott
Reading guide
 Article in the ALAN Review (Summer 2009) by Linda Rice, "Writing and Teaching Historic Fiction"
 Article in the ALAN Review (Winter 2006) by Diane P. Tuccillo, "Quiet Voices with a Big Message"

2001 American novels
Novels set during World War II
American war novels
American young adult novels
Aviation novels